Mamolj is a settlement in the hills east of Litija in central Slovenia. The area is part of the traditional region of Lower Carniola. It is now included with the rest of the municipality in the Central Sava Statistical Region. It includes the hamlets of Spodnji Mamolj, Zgornji Mamolj, Čebelnik, Češek, Podmilj, Resnarica, and Trinkavs.

Church

The local church is dedicated to John the Baptist and belongs to the Parish of Polšnik. It was built in the 18th century.

References

External links

Mamolj on Geopedia

Populated places in the Municipality of Litija